Kurgatovo (Qorğat) is a rural locality (a village) and the administrative centre of Kurgatovsky Selsoviet, Mechetlinsky District, Bashkortostan, Russia. The population was 278 as of 2010. There are 4 streets.

Geography 
Kurgatovo is located 30 km northeast of Bolsheustyikinskoye (the district's administrative centre) by road. Yulayevo is the nearest rural locality.

References 

Rural localities in Mechetlinsky District